Alexander Betts may refer to:

Alexander Betts (academic) (born 1980), British political scientist
Alejandro Betts (born 1947), Argentine air traffic controller